is a railway station on the Sanin Main Line in Matsue, Shimane, Japan, operated by West Japan Railway Company (JR West).

Lines
Tamatsukuri-Onsen Station is served by the Sanin Main Line.

Station layout
The station has a single island platform serving two tracks.

Adjacent stations

History

The station opened on 7 November 1909. With the privatization of Japanese National Railways (JNR) on 1 April 1987, the station came under the control of JR West.

Surrounding area
 Tamatsukuri Onsen
 Tamatsukuriyu Shrine
 Tamayu Junior High School

See also
 List of railway stations in Japan

External links

 JR West station information 

Railway stations in Shimane Prefecture
Sanin Main Line
Stations of West Japan Railway Company
Railway stations in Japan opened in 1909